The Florida Gators football team represents the University of Florida in the sport of American football. The university fielded its first official varsity football team in the fall of 1906, and has fielded a team every season since then, with the exception of 1943 during World War II. The University of Florida did not adopt the "Florida Gators" nickname for its sports teams until 1911, and the early Florida football teams were known simply as "Florida" or the "Orange and Blue."  The football team played most of their home games at on-campus Fleming Field until 1930, when Florida Field was constructed.

During the early 1900s, the Florida football team competed in the Intercollegiate Athletic Association of the United States (IAAUS), but was not affiliated with an athletic conference. Later, Florida was a member of the Southern Intercollegiate Athletic Association and the Southern Conference, before joining with a dozen other schools to establish the Southeastern Conference (SEC) in 1932. Since 1992, the Gators have competed in the National Collegiate Athletics Association (NCAA) Football Bowl Subdivision (FBS, formerly known as "Division I-A"), and the Eastern Division of the SEC.

The list below list presents the season-by-season win–loss records of the Gators football team from its beginning, including its post-season bowl records.

Seasons

Notes

See also 

 Florida Gators
 History of the University of Florida
 List of Florida Gators head football coaches
 List of Florida Gators in the NFL Draft
 University of Florida Athletic Hall of Fame
 University of Florida Athletic Association

References

Bibliography 

 2011 Florida Gators Football Media Guide, University Athletic Association, Gainesville, Florida, pp. 120, 123–124 (2011).
 Carlson, Norm, University of Florida Football Vault: The History of the Florida Gators, Whitman Publishing, LLC, Atlanta, Georgia (2007).  .
 Golenbock, Peter, Go Gators!  An Oral History of Florida's Pursuit of Gridiron Glory, Legends Publishing, LLC, St. Petersburg, Florida (2002).  .
 Hairston, Jack, Tales from the Gator Swamp: A Collection of the Greatest Gator Stories Ever Told, Sports Publishing, LLC, Champaign, Illinois (2002).  .
 Kabat, Ric A., "Before the Seminoles: Football at Florida State College, 1902–1904, Florida Historical Quarterly, vol. LXX, no. 1 (July 1991).
 McCarthy, Kevin M., Fightin' Gators: A History of University of Florida Football, Arcadia Publishing, Mount Pleasant, South Carolina (2000).  .
 McEwen, Tom, The Gators: A Story of Florida Football, The Strode Publishers, Huntsville, Alabama (1974).  .
 Nash, Noel, ed., The Gainesville Sun Presents The Greatest Moments in Florida Gators Football, Sports Publishing, Inc., Champaign, Illinois (1998).  .
 Proctor, Samuel, & Wright Langley, Gator History: A Pictorial History of the University of Florida, South Star Publishing Company, Gainesville, Florida (1986).  .

Florida

Florida Gators football seasons